Lusagyugh is a village in the Aparan Municipality of the Aragatsotn Province of Armenia, located 1 km northeast of the town of Aparan.

The village is home to a church dating back to 1887 as well as the ruins of a 4th-century church.

References 

Populated places in Aragatsotn Province